Paula Colton Winokur (1936–2018) was an American artist. She was one of the leading ceramic artists in the United States from the 1970s until her death in 2018.

Biography 
Winokur was born and raised in the Philadelphia. She attended Tyler School of Art, where she was a student of Rudolf Staffel, and where she met her future husband, Robert Winokur.

Paula Winokur is best known for the work she made during the 1990s through the 2010s which had an environmental focus. From the 1970s to the early 2000s, Winokur taught ceramic art at Arcadia University (formally known as Beaver College), in Glenside, Pennsylvania. In 2002 she was elected as to the College of Fellows at the American Craft Council.

Collections
 Renwick Gallery, Smithsonian American Art Museum
 Philadelphia Museum of Art

Exhibitions

 Material Legacy, Philadelphia Art Alliance, 2015
 Fellowship in Clay, The Clay Studio, 2015
 Paula Winour: A Tribute, The Clay Studio, 2019
 Wave Hill, 2012

References 

1936 births
2018 deaths
Artists from Philadelphia
American ceramists
Temple University alumni
20th-century American women artists
Arcadia University faculty
American women academics
21st-century American women